The Ladrillero Channel is a strait between Angamos Island and Stosch Island in the Magallanes Region of Chile. It forms, with the Picton Channel and the Fallos Channel, an optional route to the Messier Channel-Grappler Channel-Wide Channel. It has several arms or fiords.

The channel is named after Juan Ladrillero, a Spanish explorer of the southern coast of Chile in the 16th century. In the South America Pilot, it is still called Stosch Channel.

See also
 List of islands of Chile
 List of fjords, channels, sounds and straits of Chile
 List of Antarctic and subantarctic islands
 List of lighthouses and lightvessels in Chile

References

Further reading

Straits of Chile
Landforms of Aysén Region
Bodies of water of Magallanes Region